Cymbiodyta is a genus of hydrophilid beetles with 31 species. Twenty–eight of the species occur in the Americas and three species in the Palearctic.

Species
 Cymbiodyta acuminata Fall, 1924
 Cymbiodyta arizonica Smetana, 1974
 Cymbiodyta beckeri Smetana, 1974
 Cymbiodyta blanchardi Horn, 1890
 Cymbiodyta brevicollis (Sharp, 1882)
 Cymbiodyta brevipalpis Smetana, 1974
 Cymbiodyta campbelli Smetana, 1974
 Cymbiodyta chamberlaini Smetana, 1974
 Cymbiodyta columbiana Leech, 1948
 Cymbiodyta dorsalis (Motschulsky, 1859)
 Cymbiodyta eumera Smetana, 1974
 Cymbiodyta fraterculus (Sharp, 1882)
 Cymbiodyta howdeni Smetana, 1974
 Cymbiodyta imbellis (LeConte, 1861)
 Cymbiodyta leechi Miller, 1964
 Cymbiodyta lishizheni Jia & Lin, 2015
 Cymbiodyta marginella (Fabricius, 1792)
 Cymbiodyta minima Notman, 1919
 Cymbiodyta occidentalis Smetana, 1974
 Cymbiodyta orientalis Jia & Short, 2010
 Cymbiodyta pacifica Leech, 1948
 Cymbiodyta polita (Sharp, 1882)
 Cymbiodyta pseudopacifica Smetana, 1974
 Cymbiodyta puella Smetana, 1974
 Cymbiodyta punctatostriata (Zimmerman, 1869)
 Cymbiodyta pusilla Smetana, 1974
 Cymbiodyta rotunda (Say, 1825)
 Cymbiodyta semistriata (Zimmermann, 1869)
 Cymbiodyta seriata Smetana, 1974
 Cymbiodyta toddi Spangler, 1966
 Cymbiodyta vindicata Fall, 1924

References

Hydrophilidae genera
Hydrophilinae